Mount Stuart is a mountain in the Cascade Range, in the U.S. state of Washington. It is the second highest non-volcanic peak in the state, after Bonanza Peak and seventh-highest overall. Mount Stuart is the highest peak in the Stuart Range, and it is located in the central part of the Washington Cascades, south of Stevens Pass and east of Snoqualmie Pass in the Alpine Lakes Wilderness.

Name
Mount Stuart was given its name by George B. McClellan in September 1853 in honor of his oldest and best friend, "the late Capt. Jas. [Jimmie] Stuart of the Rifles—a gallant soldier & accomplished gentleman." Stuart had died of an arrow wound on June 18, 1851, following a skirmish with Native Americans at the base of the Siskiyou Mountains in southwest Oregon.

Topography
Mount Stuart is more notable for its local relief than for its absolute elevation. For example, the south face rises  in just 2 horizontal miles (3.2 km). The northeast and northwest sides of the mountain exhibit similar steep relief. The rock of Mount Stuart is rugged due to the extensive jointing of the granite. The north slopes of the mountain shelter three glaciers - Stuart, Ice Cliff and Sherpa Glaciers from west to east.

Climbing history
It is not known for sure who made the first ascent of Mount Stuart.  According to Fred Beckey: "Claude Rusk... was told by Frank Bryant of Yakima about finding a stick at the summit bearing the name `Angus McPherson—1873.' A. H. Sylvester, who climbed to the summit in 1897 and 1899 for triangulation, believed the first ascent was made by Frank Tweedy and Richard Goode during the Northern Pacific land survey." Tweedy (after whom Tweedy's pussypaws is named) climbed Mount Stuart on August 5, 1883, and two days later again with Goode (after whom Goode Mountain is named). They did not report finding evidence of an earlier ascent. Since the easiest route is not too technical, an earlier Native American ascent is also a possibility.

The standard route is the Cascadian Couloir up the southeast flank of the mountain, which ascends to a false summit just southeast of the main summit, and finishes along a short ridge. The route involves scrambling and often steep snow. Far more technical climbs are available on the complex north face and other aspects of the mountain.

See also

List of highest mountain peaks in Washington
List of mountain peaks of North America
List of mountain peaks of the United States
List of Ultras of the United States
Fifty Classic Climbs of North America

References

External links

 
 

Cascade Range
Mountains of Chelan County, Washington
Mountains of Washington (state)